Matthew Farrell may refer to:

People
Matthew Farrell, pseudonym of writer Stephen Leigh
Matt Farrell (born 1996), American basketball player

Fictional characters
Matthew Farrell, character in Live Free or Die Hard
Matthew Farrell, character in The Black Donnellys

See also
Edward Matthew Farrell, Canadian senator